The 1996 PGA Championship was the 78th PGA Championship, held August 8–11 at Valhalla Golf Club in Louisville, Kentucky. Mark Brooks won his only major championship with a birdie at the first hole of a sudden-death playoff with Kentucky native Kenny Perry. Defending champion Steve Elkington was a stroke out of the playoff, in a tie  for third. It was the second consecutive and final sudden-death playoff at the PGA Championship, which changed to a three-hole aggregate format, first used in 2000 at Valhalla.

It was the second major played in Kentucky and the first in 44 years; the PGA Championship, a match play event through 1957, was played in Louisville in 1952 at Big Spring Country Club. The championship returned to Valhalla just four years later in 2000, and again in 2014 after hosting the Ryder Cup in 2008.

Course designer and five-time champion Jack Nicklaus missed the cut by a single stroke at age 56. He also missed the cut by one stroke in 2000 at age 60, his final appearance in the PGA Championship.

Course layout

Source:

Round summaries

First round
Thursday, August 8, 1996
Friday, August 9, 1996

Kenny Perry shot a first round 66 (−6) to take the lead, finishing in the dark. Weather delayed play for nearly four hours and sixty players completed their first rounds on Friday morning.

Second round
Friday, August 9, 1996

Phil Mickelson, age 26, played 24 holes on Friday and carded consecutive rounds of 67 to take a three stroke lead at 134 (−10).

Third round
Saturday, August 10, 1996

Kentucky native Russ Cochran shot a course record 65 (−7) to take the 54-hole lead, two strokes ahead of Mark Brooks and Vijay Singh. Brooks eagled the par-4 15th, holing out from the fairway. Seeking his first major title, Mickelson fell three strokes back after a 74 (+2).

Source:

Final round
Sunday, August 11, 1996

Native sons of Kentucky had different results on Sunday as Cochran shot 77 (+5) in the final pairing and faded while Perry had a 68 (−4) and waited as the clubhouse leader at 277 (−11). Playing with Cochran, Brooks birdied the par-5 final hole to force a playoff. Perry bogeyed the same hole after a hooked tee shot and was in the television booth with CBS-TV, not hitting balls. The second shot of defending champion Steve Elkington found a greenside bunker; he had a  birdie putt to join the playoff, but could not convert. Tolles had a long eagle putt to tie but missed, while Singh also needed a birdie to join the playoff but made bogey to finish 2 behind.

Source:

Scorecard

Final round

Source:

Playoff
The sudden-death playoff began on the  18th hole; the par-5 was the course's second-easiest hole on Sunday. Brooks reached the green in two and birdied while Perry's tee shot again found the rough on the left and his fourth was a chip that did not reach the green, ending the playoff. It was Brooks' second birdie at the hole in twenty minutes; in regulation he hit his third shot from the greenside sand to within four feet (1.3 m).

Source:

References

External links
Full results
PGA.com – 1996 PGA Championship

PGA Championship
Golf in Kentucky
Sports competitions in Louisville, Kentucky
PGA Championship
PGA Championship
PGA Championship
PGA Championship